Tatiana Rodríguez Romero (born 8 November 1980) is a Mexican 5¨11" woman who received the national title of Miss Mexico World and competed in the 2001 Miss World pageant, held November 16, 2001 in Sun City, South Africa. She is, to this day, the first and only Nuestra Belleza México winner from the state of Campeche.

References

Living people
Nuestra Belleza México winners
Miss World 2001 delegates
People from Campeche
1980 births